Acer caudatum, commonly known as candle-shape maple, is an Asian species of maple trees. It is found in the Himalayas (Tibet, Nepal, northern and northeastern India, Myanmar) the mountains of southwestern China (Gansu, Henan, Hubei, Ningxia, Shaanxi, Sichuan, Yunnan), plus Japan, Korea, and eastern Russia.

Acer caudatum is a deciduous tree up to 10 meters tall. Leaves are up to 12 cm across, thin and papery, dark green on the top, lighter green on the underside, usually with 5 lobes but occasionally 7.

Varieties
 Acer caudatum subsp. caudatum 
 Acer caudatum subsp. multiserratum (Maxim.) A.E.Murray
 Acer caudatum subsp. ukurundense (Trautv. & C.A.Mey.) E.Murray

References

External links
 Leaf photo
 Trunk photo
 Seed photo

caudatum
Flora of temperate Asia
Flora of the Indian subcontinent
Flora of Myanmar
Plants described in 1831